An International Certificate of Competence (ICC) is a certificate, which may be issued to anyone who has successfully completed certain national boating licenses or has passed an examination to prove the necessary competence for pleasure craft operation. ICC is the only sailing license approved by United Nations as a legitimate recreational sailing license.

Persons wishing to be tested in the United Kingdom need to be tested by an approved ICC test centre 

Although only guaranteed to be accepted in countries that have adopted the relevant UN Resolution, the ICC is a useful document to carry and will generally be accepted where proof of competence is required.

In very general terms an ICC is required for the inland waterways of Europe and for inland and coastal waters of Mediterranean countries. For the coastal waters of Northern Europe the ICC is generally  not required, however to all of these generalisations there are exceptions.

Description of the ICC

The ICC is a product of the United Nations Economic Commission for Europe Inland Water Committee (UN ECE IWC) Resolution 40 (hereafter called Resolution 40). This states that the ICC may be issued by a government of one state to its nationals and residents who may be on the waters of a foreign state, on condition that both accept the requirements and conditions set out in Resolution 40.

Governments may appoint competent authorities to issue ICC on their behalf. Globally International Yacht Training Worldwide (IYT) has been delegated such authority by both Ireland and the UK, and the Royal Yachting Association (RYA) and the British Sub-Aqua Club (BSAC) are both authorized by the UK.
    
The ICC provides documentary assurance from one government to another that the holder meets the levels of competence laid down in Resolution 40. However, the acceptance of Resolution 40 is often caveated.

History of the ICC

The origins of the ICC arose from navigation on the Rhine and the Danube (Central Commission for Navigation on the Rhine) and the need for reassurance that vessel operators were competent to ensure safety of navigation and protection of the environment as they moved from one country to another. As a result, on 29 January 1979, the United Nations Working Party on Inland Water Transport adopted Resolution 14, which recommended the introduction of a European document for an International Certificate (International Card) to provide those assurances. The Resolution was also intended to facilitate 'waterborne tourism'.  Until then operators could well have been expected to produce competency certificates for each country whose waters they were on.

In the mid-nineties, the Working Group on Inland Water Transport considered that Resolution 14 needed updating and strengthening and on 16 October 1998 the Working Party adopted their revisions as Resolution 40; this replaced Resolution 14.

The International Certificate for Operators of Pleasure Craft created in Resolution 40 is now more commonly referred to as the International Certificate of Competence or simply ICC. The ICC is only applicable where the visited state has also adopted or recognises the ICC as a valid standard of competency.

Application of the ICC

Resolution 40 not only included operators of pleasure craft bound for or on the inland and coastal waters of foreign states but specifically included bareboat charter vessels. Significantly, it also set out the nautical, regulatory and technical competency requirements to be achieved and a minimum age (16 years of age) for the issue of an ICC irrespective of individual national schemes.

It is the professional opinion of the UNECE IWC that the standards set out in Resolution 40 provide a reasonable and appropriate level of competence for day sailing with due regard to the safety of navigation and crew and the protection of the environment. It is strongly recommended that governments recognise this rather than be drawn into discussions on where the ICC may or may not fit into their own national schemes – much the same as acceptance of the international driving licence.

As of 2013 only 22 countries have adopted either resolution so far, of which 16 are EU member states. In reality many countries choose to accept the ICC even though they have not adopted the resolution – but of course this is on their terms and can be subject to local variations. Spain, Greece and Portugal, for example, have not adopted Resolution 40 but are still most likely to ask visitors for an ICC. In reality, the ICC is more widely accepted as proof of the holder’s competence than adoption of Resolution 40 would suggest.

Implementation of Resolution 40
The following UNECE member states have adopted Resolution 40 and thus officially accept the ICC as a proof of competence in their territories:

Austria,
Belarus,
Belgium,
Bulgaria,
Croatia,
Czech Republic,
Finland,
Germany,
Hungary,
Ireland,
Latvia,
Lithuania,
Luxembourg,
Netherlands,
Norway,
Romania,
Serbia,
Slovakia,
South Africa (not a member state),
Switzerland
the United Kingdom
and Ukraine.

Implementation of Resolution 14
The following UNECE member states have adopted the earlier Resolution 14. Also these countries accept the ICC:

France,
Italy and
Poland.

States that have not adopted Resolution 40
The following UNECE member states have not accepted the Resolution 40 nor the Resolution 14:

Greece,
Moldova,
Portugal,
Spain,
Russian Federation,
Sweden

Individual states

Finland
Finland has adopted the resolution but does not require the ICC for normal yachts ("sufficient age and skill" is enough) and does not use CEVNI for its inland waters.

Some official and some quality assured non-official certificates (mainly the coastal master certificates of the navigation association and the scouts) are regarded as fulfilling knowledge requirements of ICC for coastal waters. Courses for the CEVNI part are arranged separately by many organisations. The certificate itself is issued by the authorities, usually based on such documents.

The ICC is required for masters of boats chartered for international voyages (in addition to a domestic certificate) and for masters of recreational vessels with a length of more than 24 metres.

Ireland
The Irish Sailing Association is uniquely authorized by the Irish Department of Transport to issue ICC's to only Irish Citizens. Holders of the ICC license are able to operate recreational vessels for recreational use in European waters where an ICC is required, and proves to local authorities that the skipper has the required Irish qualifications for skippering the vessel.

United Kingdom
International Yacht Training Worldwide (IYT Worldwide), The Royal Yachting Association (RYA),  and the British Sub-Aqua Club (BSAC) are with the authority of the Maritime and Coastguard Agency (MCA) approved to issue ICCs to those who meet the mandated requirements and the competency requirements.

ICC's are able to be issued by these Associations to citizens of Nations who are not signatories. In this manner, for example, USA citizens can gain the ICC. In the USA, NauticEd International Sailing Education facilitates the issuance of the ICC through the UK government via the Royal Yachting Association.

UK ICCs are for use on British registered vessels in the waters of foreign states that participate in Resolution 40, without the need to comply with those states’ national certification requirements. An ICC does not enable a British ICC holder to skipper a non-British registered vessel. If a British skipper wants to skipper a non-British registered vessel then he/she must be qualified per the regulations of the country in which the vessel is registered.

The UK ICC was only available to British citizens or bona fide British residents. This has now been extended to cover other Nationals.

Estonia
Estonia requires operators of a small pleasure craft (2.5-24 m with 25 m² sail area or 25 kW+ power) to have an International Certificate of Competence. The Maritime Administration has licensed training institutions to carry through courses, based on which the Road Administration issues Certificates of Competence that conform to international standards.

See also 
 Code Européen des Voies de la Navigation Intérieure (European Code for Inland Waterways)

References

Maritime education
Boating
Sailing qualifications